The Ojuela Bridge  or the Mapimi Bridge (Puente de Ojuela, Spanish name) is a suspension bridge located in Mapimí, in the Mexican state of Durango, at the site of the Ojuela Goldmine. The Ojuela Bridge was designed by Wilhelm Hildenbrand and built by the firm of John A. Roebling Sons Company, New York. Completed in 1898 the bridge was restored as a tourist attraction in 1991. It has a main span of 271.5 metres and the distance between the pylons is 315.5 metres. Currently this bridge is only used for pedestrians.

Two plaques were posted on the bridge to commemorate 100 years since its setting it up.
The Ojuela Bridge Plaque reads:

Gallery

References

External links
 
 Photographs of Ojuela Bridge ca. 1910

Suspension bridges in Mexico
Bridges completed in 1898
Buildings and structures in Durango